Greenmount Railway Station served the village of Greenmount in the Metropolitan Borough of Bury.

History

The station closed when passenger services were withdrawn from the Holcombe Brook line on 5 May 1952.

References

Lost Railways of Lancashire by Gordon Suggitt

External links
Greenmount Station on navigable 1948 O.S. map

Disused railway stations in the Metropolitan Borough of Bury
Former Lancashire and Yorkshire Railway stations
Railway stations in Great Britain opened in 1882
Railway stations in Great Britain closed in 1952